Acianthera modestissima is a species of orchid. The flower is magenta in color and is very small.

modestissima